The Norfolk IceCats were a semi-professional hockey team in the North Eastern Hockey League (NEHL) based in Simcoe, Ontario, Canada owned by Jim Cashman. The franchise was previously known as the York IceCats until a move to St. Catharines, Ontario in 2005. However, the league suspended operations for the season after only six games played.  For the 2006-07 season the IceCats were known as the Mohawk Valley IceCats, playing in Utica, New York.

The IceCats played in the league finals in both the 2003-04 and 2006-07 seasons.  In the 2007-08 season they were dominating the league before the NEHL suspended operations. They had outscored their opposition 65-33 in six games.

Regular season records

(*) 05-06 season- CPHL disbanded mid-season
(**)07-08 season- NEHL disbanded mid-season

Franchise history

North Eastern Hockey League teams
Norfolk County, Ontario
2007 establishments in Ontario
Ice hockey clubs established in 2007
2008 disestablishments in Ontario
Sports clubs disestablished in 2008